Daniel Nestor and Nenad Zimonjić were the defending champions, but chose not to participate together. Nestor played alongside Leander Paes, but lost to Feliciano López and Max Mirnyi in the second round.
Zimonjić partnered up with Marcin Matkowski, but lost in the final to Rohan Bopanna and Florin Mergea, 2–6, 7–6(7–5), [9–11].

Seeds
All seeds receive a bye into the second round.

Draw

Finals

Top half

Bottom half

References 
 Main Draw

Men's Doubles